The flag of Serbia, also known as the Tricolour, is a tricolour consisting of three equal horizontal bands, red on the top, blue in the middle, and white on the bottom. The same tricolour, in altering variations, has been used since the 19th century as the flag of the state of Serbia and the Serbian nation. The current form of the flag was adopted in 2004 and slightly redesigned in 2010.

Design
The complete design and symbols and lettering were taken from the Byzantine flag (last Roman, Greek speaking, dynasty)

The state flag bears the lesser coat of arms, centred vertically and shifted to the hoist side by one-seventh of the flag's length. The flag ratio is 2 to 3 (height/width), with three equal horizontal bands of red, blue and white, each taking one third of the height. Recommended colors (white and black are not documented in Pantone) are:

 Only used on the greater arms' ermine mantling, as seen on the presidential standards.

Symbolism 
The red stands for blood shed for the country, blue stands for freedom, while white represents "mother’s milk feeding strong Serbian children".

History

Medieval flags

Flag of Stefan Vladislav

The son of King Stefan Vladislav (reigned 1233–1243), župan Desa, sent delegates from Kotor to Ragusa (Dubrovnik) to bring back part of the king's treasury held at Ragusa, which they did on 3 July 1281; the inventory list included, among other things, "a flag of red and blue color". It is described as vexillum unum de zendato rubeo et blavo—"a flag of fabric red and blue"; zendato being a type of light, silky fabric. This is the oldest known attestation of colours of a Serbian flag; the oldest known Serbian flag was red and blue. But already in 1271 the flag colors of župan Desa were red and white. Although the color order is not known, the version with horizontal red and blue is sometimes used in medieval-themed events in modern Serbia.

Flag of King Stefan Uroš
Hungarian King Bela IV mentioned in his charter dated 8 April 1268, that his army had defeated King Stefan Uroš I (reigned 1243–1276), and that when he hosted some foreign rulers, his magnates brought captured Serbs and "in the sign of triumph, the flag of King Uroš before the court of Bela IV, and erected it there".

Flag of King Stefan Dečanski
In 1326, king Stefan Dečanski sent a delegate to the Mamluk Sultanate in Alexandria and sought a flag in yellow colour, to be used as a war flag. The Byzantines mention that there were several war flags hoisted by the Serbs at the Battle of Velbazhd (1330), and the yellow one was likely one of those.

Flags of Emperor Stefan Dušan

The oldest known drawing of a Serbian flag is from the 1339 map made by Angelino Dulcert; Serbia, at the time ruled by King Stefan Dušan, is represented by a white flag of a red double-headed eagle placed above the capital Skopje (Scopi). Stefan Dušan was crowned Emperor in 1346; Dušan also adopted the Byzantine tetragramme with four fire-steels, which afterwards became an element of the Serbian flag until today (the Serbian cross). A flag in Hilandar, seen by Dimitrije Avramović, was alleged by the brotherhood to have been a flag of Emperor Dušan; it was a triband of red at the top and bottom and white in the centre. Emperor Dušan also adopted the Imperial divelion, which was purple and had a golden cross in the centre. Another of Dušan's flags was the Imperial cavalry flag, kept at the Hilandar monastery on Mount Athos; a triangular bicolor flag, of red and yellow.

Revolutionary flags

During the First Serbian Uprising, various flags were used. Among the early flags, the one described by Mateja Nenadović could be connected with today's flag and the first Serbian flag: it was red-blue-red with three white crosses. Similar flags bearing only one Serbian cross could also be found. Regular armies of the uprising usually had light yellow flags with various symbols, while voivode flags were often red-white, and with a superimposed black two-headed eagle. There were also flags of other colors, including red-yellow, red-white-blue and red-blue. This variety of colors was followed by variety of symbols on the flags, most often taken from Hristofor Zhefarovich's book Stemmatographia of 1741. The most common symbol on the flags were the Serbian cross, followed by coat of arms of the Timok Valley (Tribalia) and various other crosses. Most of the flags were made in Sremski Karlovci, designed by Serbian painters Stefan Gavrilović, Ilija Gavrilović and Nikola Apostolović. These would carry over to the Second Serbian Uprising as well, alongside its own flags, the most well known of which being the Takovo flag, a white flag with a large red Greek cross in the center.

Modern flags

The 1835 Sretenje Constitution described the colors of the Serbian flag as bright red, white and čelikasto-ugasita (that could be translated as steelish-dark). The constitution was criticized, especially by Russia, and the flag was specifically singled out as being similar to the revolutionary flag of France. Soon afterwards, Miloš Obrenović was requesting to the Porte that the new constitution should contain an article about the flag and coat of arms, and subsequent ferman (1835) allowed Serbs to use their own maritime flag, which will have "upper part of red, middle of blue, and lower of white", which is the first appearance of the colors that are used today.

The colors are the reverse of those on the flag of Russia, and various popular stories exist in Serbia which seek to explain why. An example:

Serbia used the red, blue and white tricolor as a national flag continuously from 1835 until 1918, when Serbia ceased to be a sovereign state after it joined the Kingdom of Serbs, Croats and Slovenes, later known as Yugoslavia, the tricolor was a used as a Serbian civil flag, from 1918 to 1945. Also in 1918, a Serbian flag was flown over the White House in Washington, D.C. as a show of solidarity by the U.S. towards Serbia during World War I.

After World War II, Yugoslavia was reformed into a socialist federal republic, composed of six republics, one of which was Serbia. Each republic was entitled to its own flag on the condition that it contained the socialist red star. The standardization of the flags of the Yugoslav Republics meant that the flag of SR Serbia was identical to that of SR Montenegro, as they continued the use of the tricolours of the Kingdom of Serbia and the Kingdom of Montenegro respectively. Following the breakup of Yugoslavia, Serbia initially continued using the flag of Serbia as a Yugoslav republic; the 1990 Constitution of Serbia stated that flag and coat of arms of Serbia can only be changed by the same procedure used to change the constitution itself, which required an absolute majority of voters to support it. The 1992 Serbian constitutional referendum asked the voters to choose between the flag with and without the star, with red star gaining the majority of votes, however not the absolute majority of voters. The red star was nonetheless removed from the flag in 1992 by a recommendation by the Serbian parliament; however, the coat of arms remained unchanged. In 2004, however, the government of Serbia issued a recommendation on flag and coat of arms use, that preferred using different symbols from the ones in the constitution. The 2006 Constitution of Serbia stated that state emblems would be regulated by law; the recommendation remained in use until 11 May 2009, when the actual flag law was enacted. On 11 November 2010, a visual redesign of the coat of arms was enacted, which is currently used on the state flag.

The Serbian flag is also popular with Serbs in the Republika Srpska, who usually prefer to fly it instead of the national flag of Bosnia and Herzegovina.

Flag protocol

State flag
The state flag (de facto national flag) is constantly flown on the entrances of state buildings. The National Assembly flies it only when in session and during national holidays. Institutions of provinces, Vojvodina and Kosovo and Metohija, fly it only on national holidays.

It can also be flown during celebrations and other solemn manifestations which mark events of importance for Serbia, and on other occasions. During state mourning, it is flown at half mast, including by the organs of provinces, local organs, and public services. The flag must be displayed in an election room during an election for state bodies and in the room of civil registry dedicated for marriage (the officiant has to carry a sash with flag colours as well).

Civil flag
The civil flag of Serbia is constantly flown on the entrance of the National Assembly and organs of provinces and public services. It must be displayed in an election room during an election for provincial or local organs.

Also, it can be hoisted during celebrations and other cultural or sport manifestations, and on other occasions.

Other flags
The President of Serbia and the President (Speaker) of the National Assembly of Serbia use their official respective standards.  The Serbian River Flotilla also uses its own naval ensign.

Respect for the flag
Neither the state flag nor the civil flag can be hoisted so that they touch the ground, nor be used as rests, tablecloths, carpets or curtains, nor to cover vehicles or other objects, nor to attire speaker platforms or tables, except as table flags. They must not be used if damaged or otherwise look unsuitable for use.

The flag is not flown in bad weather conditions. Also, it is flown only in daylight, unless it is illuminated.

If the flag is flown vertically on tables or otherwise, its top field is on the left side of the viewer. If it is flown vertically across a street or square, its top field should be on the northern side if the street has east–west orientation, and eastern side if it has north–south orientation or on a circular square.

Correct display

The law defines how the flag of Serbia is displayed along with other flags, making no difference between state flags and other kinds of flags. If the flag is hoisted with another flag, it is always on the viewer's left, except during an official visit of a representative of another country or an international organization, when the flag of the visitor is on the viewer's left. If the flag is hoisted with another on crossed staffs, its staff must be the front one.

If the flag of Serbia is hoisted along with two flags, it must be in the middle.

If the flag is flown with multiple flags,
 If the flags are flown in a circle, it must be in the centre of the circle, clearly visible;
 If the flags are flown in a semicircle, it must be in its vertex;
 If the flags are flown in a column, it must be in the front of the column;
 If the flags are flown in a row, it must be in the first place, that is, on the viewer's left;
 If the flags are flown in a group, it must be in the front of the group.

Related flags

Montenegro used to have a flag similar to the Serbian tricolor with varying shades of blue. It originated from Montenegrin national costume. During the second Yugoslavia, the republics of Serbia and Montenegro had flags of the same design and colors. Montenegro changed its flag in 1993 by altering the proportion and shade of blue in its flag and used this flag until 2004.

The Serbian tricolor was also the basis for the breakaway territories of Republic of Serbian Krajina and Republika Srpska during the Yugoslav Wars. The flag of Republika Srpska is still the Serbian tricolor as well as Flag of Serbs of Croatia.

The Serbian tricolor defaced with a Serbian cross is used as the flag of the Serbian Orthodox Church. A number of other unofficial variant flags, some with variations of the cross, coat of arms, or both, exist.

See also

List of Serbian flags
Flag of Yugoslavia
Flag of Serbia and Montenegro
Jemstvenik

Notes

References

Sources
Official documents
 

Secondary sources
 
 
 
 
 
 
 
 
 
 
 
 
Krkljuš, L. 2009, "Features and symbols during the Serbian Nationalist Movement from 1848 to 1849", Istraživanja, no. 20, pp. 145–159

External links

Historical flags and arms of Serbia 
Flags and arms of Serbia in period times (in German)
Flags and arms of Serbia

Serbia
 
National symbols of Serbia
Serbia
Serbia
Serbia
Serbian culture